Jessica Ebenstein Grose is an American journalist, editor, and novelist. She is the author of the 2012 novel Sad Desk Salad, the co-author of 2009's LOVE, MOM: Poignant, Goofy, Brilliant Messages from Home, and 2016's Soulmates: A Novel. Since October 2021, Grose has written for The New York Times opinion section.

Early life 
Grose was born in New York City and is the daughter of psychiatrist and photographer Dr. Judith Ebenstein Grose and cardiologist Dr. Richard M. Grose.

In 2004, Grose graduated from Brown University.

Career 
Grose began her journalism career as associate editor of Jezebel, a blog owned by Gawker Media. Soon after, Grose and author Doree Shafrir began a popular blog titled Postcards From Yo Momma, which became the basis for a book published by Hyperion Books in March 2009 titled LOVE, MOM: Poignant, Goofy, Brilliant Messages from Home.

Grose was named managing editor of Slate's women's site DoubleX in 2009, and co-hosted its "DoubleX Gabfest" podcast alongside Hanna Rosin and Noreen Malone.

In 2012, Grose published her debut novel Sad Desk Salad through William Morrow Paperbacks / HarperCollins. It was billed "The Devil Wears Prada for the blogger age" and praised for its wit and accurate portrayal of the media by its reviewers and authors Jennifer Weiner and Amy Sohn. The novel chronicles writer Alex Lyons and satirizes the frenetic pace and moral traps of high-traffic blogging. The story is inspired by Grose's own early media career editing popular websites, including Slate and Jezebel.

Grose was deputy editor of Vulture, the culture blog of New York magazine.

Grose covers women's issues, parenting, and contemporary culture. She is a regular contributor to Fast Company, Bloomberg Businessweek, and Slate magazines. Her essays and featured reporting appear in The New York Times, Glamour, New York, Elle, The New Republic, Spin and The Village Voice.

In June 2015, Grose became editor-in-chief of Lenny Letter, a feminist newsletter and online publication co-founded by Lena Dunham and Jenni Konner.

In 2018, Grose became the parenting columnist for The New York Times. In October 2021, she moved to the New York Times opinion section to write a newsletter about what it means to be a parent.

Her book Screaming on the Inside: The Unsustainability of American Motherhood was published in December of 2022.

Personal life 
In 2010, Grose married Michael Winton. They live in Brooklyn, New York, with their two daughters.

Works and publications 
Monographs
 
 
Novels
 
 
Selected articles
  also known as Home Economics: How Couples Manage Their Money

References

External links
 
 Jessica Grose at HarperCollinsPublishers
 Jessica Grose at The New York Times
 Jessica Grose at Slate
 Jessica Grose at New York
 Jessica Grose at Bloomberg Businessweek

Living people
21st-century American novelists
21st-century American women writers
American women journalists
American online publication editors
American women novelists
21st-century American non-fiction writers
Year of birth missing (living people)
Brown University alumni
Writers from New York City
American women editors